(+)-β-Caryophyllene synthase (EC 4.2.3.89, GcoA) is an enzyme with systematic name (2Z,6E)-farnesyl-diphosphate diphosphate-lyase (cyclizing, (+)-β-caryophyllene-forming). This enzyme catalyses the following chemical reaction:

 (2E,6E)-farnesyl diphosphate  (+)-β-caryophyllene + diphosphate

This enzyme also converts the (+)-β-caryophyllene to (+)-caryolan-1-ol.

References

External links 
 

EC 4.2.3